Walter Gale may refer to:

 Walter Gale (schoolmaster), schoolmaster in Mayfield, England
 Walter Frederick Gale (1865–1945), Australian banker and astronomer